The Hotel Plaza Athénée was a 5-star hotel at 37 East 64th Street between Park Avenue and Madison Avenue on the Upper East Side of Manhattan, New York City, US.

History
Built in 1927 as the Hotel Alrae and designed by George F. Pelham, it was renamed the Plaza Athénée in 1984. It is owned by Thai billionaire  Charoen Sirivadhanabhakdi.

The hotel has been closed since March 26, 2020, due to the COVID-19 pandemic.

References

The Leading Hotels of the World
Hotel buildings completed in 1927
Hotels established in 1927
Hotels in Manhattan
1927 establishments in New York City
Upper East Side